Sweet Water is a town in Marengo County, Alabama, United States. It was founded during the 1840s and named for Sweet Water Creek, which runs through a section of the community. The population was 228 at the 2020 census, down from 258 at the 2010 census.

Geography

Alabama State Route 10 passes through the town, leading southeast  to Pine Hill and west  to Butler.

Sweet Water Creek forms the southern border of the town and flows southwest to Horse Creek, a west-flowing tributary of the Tombigbee River.

Demographics
As of the census of 2010, there were 258 people, 94 households, and 72 families residing in the town. There were 111 housing units, of which 94 were occupied. The racial makeup of the town was 91.1% White, 7.8% Black or African American, and 1.2% from some other races. 1.2% of the population were Hispanic or Latino of any race.

There were 94 households, out of which 31.9% had children under the age of 18 living with them, 66.0% were married couples living together, 7.4% had a female householder with no husband present, 3.2% had a male householder with no wife present, and 23.4% were non-families. 22.3% of all households were made up of individuals, and 14.9% had someone living alone who was 65 years of age or older. The average household size was 2.74 and the average family size was 3.22.

The population was spread out, with 70.9% 18 years and over, 68.2% 21 years and over, 20.5% 62 years and over, and 19.4% who were 65 years and over. The median age was 39 years.

Education
The town is home to Sweet Water High School, part of the Marengo County Public School System. The current school was founded during the early 1870s.

Notable people

 David Beverly, former American football punter for the Houston Oilers and Green Bay Packers

References

Towns in Marengo County, Alabama
Towns in Alabama